Nephelosia is a monotypic moth genus in the subfamily Arctiinae erected by George Hampson in 1900. Its single species, Nephelosia caecina, was first described by Herbert Druce in 1897. It is found in Guatemala.

References

Lithosiini
Monotypic moth genera
Moths of Central America